No Man's Valley is an animated TV special written by Christopher Brough and Frank Buxton. It was originally aired on the CBS network November 23, 1981. It was executive produced by Lee Mendelson and Phil Howort, produced and directed by Bill Melendez, and co-directed by Phil Roman.

Synopsis
Elliot, a rare California condor, must find a hideaway for endangered animals before humans drive them over the brink into extinction.

Voice cast
Henry Corden as Chief
Frank Buxton as Elliot
Art Metrano as Abe
Hal Smith as George
Chanin Hale as Nipponia
Arnold Stang as Fred Firmwing
Barney Phillips as Pere David
Joe E. Ross as Daniel
Desirée Goyette as Pat
Richard Deacon as Panda
John Stephenson as Herman

Uncredited
Hal Smith as Louis
John Stephenson as Protester

Credits
 Executive Producers: Lee Mendelson, Phil Howort
 Written by: Christopher Brough and Frank Buxton
 Creative Consultant: David Hooper
 Original Music by: Desirée Goyette
 Music Arranged and Conducted by: Ed Bogas
 A Lee Mendelson-Phil Howort Production
 In association with Bill Melendez Productions and Frank Fehmers Productions
 Produced and Directed by: Bill Melendez
 Based on an original idea by: Harrie Geelen and Imme Dross
 And original art concepts by: Michael Jupp and Elsa Godfrey
 Co-Directed by: Phil Roman
 "Welcome to No Man's Valley" sung by: Desirée Goyette
 Production Designed by: Bernie Gruver, Evert Brown
 Color by: Dean Spille
 Animation by: Sam Jaimes, Bob Carlson, Al Pabian, Bill Littlejohn, Hank Smith, Fernando Gonzalez, Joe Roman, Larry Leichliter, Dale Baer, Utit Choomuang
 Checking: Eve Fletcher, Joanne Lansing, Jane Gonzales
 Ink and Paint: Adele Lenart, Micky Kreymann, Karin Holmquist, Roubina Janian, Valerie Green, Joan Pabian, Karen Webb, Lee Hoffman, Emalene Seutter, Chandra Poweris
 Editing: Chuck McCann, Roger Donley
 Dialogue Editing: Les Wolf
 Production Manager: Carole Barnes
 Production Assistants: Sandy Claxton Arnold, Carol Neal, Jane Mason
 Camera: Nick Vasu
 Mix: Producers' Sound Service
 Color: Technicolor

Production
This was the final project of Joe E. Ross.

References

External links
 

1980s animated television specials
CBS television specials
Television shows directed by Bill Melendez
Television shows directed by Phil Roman
1980s American television specials
1981 television specials
1981 in American television
Works about birds
Extinction in fiction